Beith Town railway station was a railway station serving the town of Beith, North Ayrshire, Scotland. The station was originally part of the Glasgow, Barrhead and Kilmarnock Joint Railway.

History 
The station opened on 26 June 1873 as Beith. It was renamed Beith Town on 28 February 1953, and closed permanently to passengers on 5 November 1962. Freight services continued at the station until 1964. The station was the terminus of a five-mile branch from Lugton.

Gallery

Redevelopment
The station site has since been redeveloped into a housing estate.

References

Notes

Sources 
 
 
 Reid, Donald L. & Monahan, Isobel F. (1999). Yesterday's Beith. A Pictorial Guide. Beith : Duke of Edinburgh Award. . P. 71.

Disused railway stations in North Ayrshire
Former Glasgow, Barrhead and Kilmarnock Joint Railway stations
Railway stations in Great Britain opened in 1873
Railway stations in Great Britain closed in 1962
Beith